Anne Homer Doerflinger (November 15, 1907 – May 16, 1995) was an American writer who is best known for her short works of fiction. Under the name Anne Homer she published more than 100 short stories in magazines like Good Housekeeping, The Ladies Home Journal, Mademoiselle, and The Saturday Evening Post among others.

Biography
She was born on October 15, 1907, in New Jersey as Anne Homer.

A 1929 graduate of Smith College, she was the daughter of composer Sidney Homer and opera singer Louise Homer. She notably penned a biography on her mother: Louise Homer and the Golden Age of Opera (1974, William Morrow and Company).

Homer's sister was the author Joy Homer who died in 1946 at the age of 31 after a prolonged illness. Joy was married to editor William Main Doerflinger of E.P. Dutton and Macmillan Publishing, and the couple had one daughter together, Katherine. Anne took care of her sister and her family through the years illness, and following Joy's death, she became William's second wife. Anne and William had four children of their own together.

She lived in Convent Station, New Jersey. Homer died at the age of 87 of cancer at Morristown Memorial Hospital in Morristown, New Jersey.

References

1907 births
1995 deaths
American fiction writers
Smith College alumni
20th-century American women writers
Deaths from cancer in New Jersey
Writers from New Jersey